Timocharis of Alexandria ( or Τιμοχάρης, gen. Τιμοχάρους; c. 320–260 BC) was a Greek astronomer and philosopher. Likely born in Alexandria, he was a contemporary of Euclid.

Work
What little is known about Timocharis comes from citations by Ptolemy in the Almagest. These indicate that Timocharis worked in Alexandria during the 290s and 280s BC. Ptolemy lists the declination of 18 stars as recorded by Timocharis or Aristillus in roughly the year 290 BC. Between 295 and 272 BC, Timocharis recorded four lunar occultations and the passage of the planet Venus across a star. These were recorded using both the Egyptian and Athenian calendars. The observed stellar passage by Venus may have occurred on October 12, 272 BC when the planet came within 15 arcminutes of the star η Virginis.

The observations by Timocharis are among the oldest Greek records that can be assigned a specific date. They are only exceeded by records of the summer solstice of 432 BC, as noted by Euctemon and Meton. Timocharis worked with Aristillus in an astronomical observatory that was most likely part of the Library of Alexandria. Their equipment would have been simple, most likely consisting of gnomons, sundials and an armillary sphere. The two were contemporaries of Aristarchus of Samos, but it is unclear whether there was any association between Timocharis and Aristarchus.

During his astronomical observations, Timocharis recorded that the star Spica was located 8° west of the Autumnal equinox. Later, Hipparchus observed that Spica was only 6° west of the Autumnal equinox. Hipparchus was able to deduce the period during which Timocharis made his observations based upon the records of earlier lunar eclipses. From this difference, Hipparchus discovered that the longitudes of the stars had changed over time, which led him to determine the first value of the precession of the equinoxes as no less than 1/100° per year.

In approximately 3rd century BC, with the help of Aristillus, he created the first star catalogue in the Western world.

He is regarded as the first astronomer to have made a recorded mention of the planet Mercury.

The crater Timocharis on the Moon is named after him.

References

320s BC births
260 BC deaths
3rd-century BC Greek people
Ancient Greek astronomers